The 635th Supply Chain Operations Wing, United States Air Force, is a logistics wing. It reports to the Air Force Sustainment Center, part of Air Force Materiel Command, and serves as the Air Force's new supply chain manager headquartered at Scott Air Force Base, Illinois. It is an associate tenant at the base.

History
The wing was originally activated at U-Tapao Royal Thai Navy Airfield in June 1966 as the Pacific Air Forces support organization for operations from the base, primarily the Strategic Air Command Young Tiger Task Force.

Activated as the headquarters for the Mobility Air Forces Logistics Support Center (redesignated 635th Supply Chain Management Group) and the Combat Air Forces Logistics Support Center (redesignated 735th Supply Chain Management Group) in 2008.

Its units now include the:
 635th Supply Chain Operations Group, Scott Air Force Base, Illinois
 735th Supply Chain Operations Group, Langley Air Force Base, Virginia
 635th Materiel Maintenance Group, Holloman Air Force Base, New Mexico
 Detachment 1, Air Force Petroleum Office, Ft. Belvoir, Virginia

Lineage
 Constituted as the 635th Combat Support Group on 17 May 1966 and activated (not organized)
 Organized on 8 July 1966
 Redesignated 635th Aerospace Support Group on 30 January 1976
 Inactivated on 20 June 1976
 Redesignated 635th Supply Chain Management Wing on 12 March 2008
 Activated on 1 April 2008
 Redesignated 635th Supply Chain Operations Wing on 30 June 2010

Assignments
 Pacific Air Forces, 17 May 1966 (not organized)
 Thirteenth Air Force, 8 July 1966
 17th Air Division, 1 July 1975
 Thirteenth Air Force, 1 January 1976 - 20 June 1976
 Air Force Global Logistics Support Center, 1 April 2008 (attached to Air Force Sustainment Center after 11 July 2012)
 Air Force Sustainment Center, 1 October 2012 – present

Stations
 U Tapao Royal Thai Navy Airfield, Thailand 8 July 1966 - 20 June 1976
 Scott Air Force Base, Illinois, 1 April 2008 – present

Components

Groups
 635th Supply Chain Management Group (later 635th Supply Chain Operations Group), 1 April 2008 - 
 735th Supply Chain Management Group (later 735th Supply Chain Operations Group), 1 April 2008 -

Squadrons
 635th Air Police Squadron (later 635th Security Police Squadron), 8 July 1966 - 20 June 1976
 635th Civil Engineering Squadron, 8 July 1966 - 20 June 1976
 635th Munitions Maintenance Squadron, 15 May 1967 - 20 June 1976
 635th Services Squadron, 8 July 1966 - 28 February 1975
 635th Supply Squadron, 8 July 1966 - 20 June 1976

Other
 11th USAF Dispensary (later 11th USAF Hospital), 8 July 1966 - 20 June 1976

Awards and campaigns

References

Notes

Bibliography

External links
Scott AFB Home Page

Military units and formations in Illinois
0635
Logistics units and formations of the United States Air Force
Military units and formations established in 2010